Wolica  is a village in the administrative district of Gmina Łapanów, within Bochnia County, Lesser Poland Voivodeship, in southern Poland. It had a population of 230 in 2005.

References

Villages in Bochnia County